Hanako may refer to:

People with the given name Hanako:
 Hanako (given name) meaning Flower Child
 Hanako, Princess Hitachi, Hanako Tsugaru, later Princess Hitachi of Japan
 Hanako Takigawa (1988) Japanese gravure model, actress and TV talent
 Hanako Oshima, Japanese musician
 Ōta Hisa (1868–1945), a Japanese actress who toured Europe and posed for Auguste Rodin and went by the name Hanako

Other
 Hanako (fish), a fish which lived for over two hundred years
Hanako, film by Makoto Satō (director)
 Hanako (magazine), a women's magazine in Japan
 Hanako Games, a developer of downloadable computer games
 Hanako-san, a Japanese urban legend about the ghost of a young girl who haunts school bathrooms
 Hanako, a character of the manga Hanako and the Terror of Allegory
 Hanako Ikezawa, a character of the visual novel Katawa Shoujo
 Hanako, a character of the drama Hanako to Anne
 "Hanako" (Yoko Ono song), a bonus track on Japanese release of Between My Head and the Sky
 Hanako Ohmuro, a character from YuruYuri